The 3rd Division was a unit of the Reichswehr.

Creation 
In the Order of 31 July 1920 for the Reduction of the Army (to comply with the upper limits on the size of the military contained in the Treaty of Versailles), it was determined that a division would be established in every Wehrkreis (military district) by 1 October 1920. The 3rd Division was formed in January 1921 out of the Reichswehr-Brigaden 3, 6 and 15, all part of the former Übergangsheer (Transition Army).

It consisted of 3 infantry regiments, an artillery regiment, an engineering battalion, a signals battalion, a transportation battalion, and a medical battalion.

The commander of the Wehrkreis III was simultaneously the commander of the 3rd Division.
For the leadership of the troops, an Infanterieführer and an Artillerieführer were appointed, both subordinated to the commander of the Division.

The unit ceased to exist as such after October 1934 and its subordinate units were transferred to one of the 21 Divisions newly created in that year.

Commanding officers
General der Artillerie Hermann Rumschöttel, 1 October 1920 – 16 June 1921
General der Infanterie Richard von Berendt, 16 June 1921 – 3 August 1921
General der Kavallerie Rudolf von Horn, 3 August 1921 – 31 January 1926
General der Infanterie Otto Hasse, 1 February 1926 – 1 April 1929
General der Infanterie Rudolf Schniewindt, 1 April 1929 – 1 October 1929
General der Infanterie Joachim von Stülpnagel, 1 October 1929 – 1 February 1932
General der Infanterie Gerd von Rundstedt, 1 February 1932 – 1 October 1932
Generalleutnant Werner Freiherr von Fritsch, 1 October 1932 – 1 February 1934

Infanterieführers
Generalmajor Karl von Fabeck (1 Oct 1920 - 31 Mar 1921)
Generalmajor Ernst Hasse (1 Apr 1921 - 31 Mar 1922)
Generalmajor Gottfried Edelbüttel (1 Apr 1922 - 31 Jan 1925)
Generalmajor Friedrich Freiherr von Esebeck (1 Feb 1925 - 31 Oct 1926)
Generalmajor Heinrich von Bünau (1 Nov 1926 - 31 Jan 1929)
Generalleutnant Wolfgang Fleck (1 Feb 1929 - 30 Apr 1931)
Generalmajor Hugo Zeitz (1 May 1931 - 30 Sep 1931)
Generalmajor Ulrich von Waldow (1 Oct 1931 - 31 Jan 1933)
Generalmajor Maximilian Freiherr von Weichs (1 Feb 1933 - 30 Sep 1933)
Generalmajor Wilhelm Keitel (1 Oct 1933 - 30 Sep 1934)
Generalmajor Hermann Hoth (1 Oct 1934 - 15 Oct 1935)

Notable Artillerieführers  
Generalmajor Theodor Endres (1 Nov 1930 - 30 Sep 1931)
Generalmajor Günther von Kluge (1 Nov 1931 - 30 Sep 1933)
Generalmajor Wilhelm Keitel (1 Oct 1933 - 31 Mar 1934)

Garrisons 
The divisional headquarters was in Berlin.

References

 Feldgrau.com

Infantry divisions of Germany
Military units and formations established in 1920
Military units and formations disestablished in 1934